The Finale may refer to:

"The Finale" (Everybody Loves Raymond), the final episode of Everybody Loves Raymond
"The Finale" (Seinfeld), the final two episodes of Seinfeld
"The Finale" (Will & Grace), the final episode of Will & Grace
"The Finale" (The Nanny), the final episode of The Nanny
"The Finale" (The Big C), the final episode of The Big C
"The Finale", a song by Jolin Tsai from the 2006 album Dancing Diva

See also
 Finale (disambiguation)